Yang Tingzhong is a scholar in social medicine, a behaviorist and sociologist.

Biography
Dr. Yang moved to  Guyuan when he was a child, a village in the Ningxia Muslim Hui Autonomous Region, an area which blends Muslim culture with that of the Han Chinese. This background, combined with traumatic experiences in the Great Famine during Maozedong's Cultural Revolution, made him cognizant of distinctive patterns of health behaviors under this culture norms. In turn, this laid the foundation for the main focus of his career, tobacco control. Smoking in the People's Republic of China represents an enormous public health problem. Many Chinese universities are developing training programs for medical students to improve capacity for tobacco control advocacy. Since 2007, Yang has been directing the first program aiming at promoting all forms of tobacco control in Chinese universities. Projects comprising this program are sponsored by the Bloomberg Initiative to Reduce Tobacco Use. The first goal of the project is to conduct tobacco control advocacy capacity training among medical students and the second goal is ban smoking on university campuses nationwide. Currently, the project currently covers all provinces, municipalities, and autonomous regions in China which involves 102 universities from  more than 71 cities. A total of about 280,000 medical students capable of tobacco control advocacy had been trained through this project. All participating universities have adopted smoking-free campus policies, with a third of them expected to achieve the goals set by the project. The outcomes of this research project have been reported by the WHO, selected in the university's Research Highlights at the 120th anniversary of Zhejiang University, and was introduced under the title of "Using Cultural Understanding to Stub out Killer Habit" in Nature. Yang is a leader in this initiative, and produces numerous publications in major journals with many international collaborators. Several papers were cited by WHO report on the global tobacco epidemic, and other official documents.  Core information of "Global Health Professions Student Survey (GHPSS) in Tobacco Control in China "was released by the United Nations.

Yang graduated from Shanxi Medicine University (Public Health) in 1982. He was appraised as an outstanding contributing scientist by the government of Jiangsu Province in 1994. Yang served as Assistant Research Scientist at the University of California, San Diego  from 1998 to 2000. He is a full professor in the Department of Social Medicine at Zhejiang University.

Position
Yang is currently the Director and full professor of Zhejiang University's Research Center for Tobacco Control and Department of Social Medicine at Zhejiang University. He was a past advisor for the World Health Organization (WHO) in delivering policy and program on tobacco control to health professions students, and served as an expert in updating management of CRDs in the WHO Global Action Plan 2013–2020.
He is also a member, the expert committee of the National Association on Tobacco Control, review committee for science and technology awards of Chinese Preventive Medicine Association, and an external faculty affiliate at the West Virginia University's Injury Control Research Center in the United States.

Yang was the Asian Editor for the American Journal of Health behavior, is Associate Editor of BMC Public Health, and is a peer reviewer for more than 20 journals including Nicotine & Tobacco Research,  Social Psychiatry and Psychiatric Epidemiology, Journal of Applied Biobehavioral Research, Collegium Antropologicum, Public Health; Health & Social Care in the Community; The Chinese Journal of Epidemiology;  The Chinese Journal of Preventive Medicine; and Acta Psychologica Sinica.

His primary academic domain is epidemiology, behavioural science and public health.

Available Papers and Books
 scientificcommons.org -  Resources and Information.
 
 
 大三巴牌坊很恐怖-我看见她脸上都写着呢，她一脸的“嘿，别把我扯进来。”-原音天气网
 Ai zi bing wei xian xing wei kuo san de she hui xue yan jiu

References

External links
 www.cmm.zju.edu.cn
 apruglobalhealth.org

Living people
Chinese sociologists
People's Republic of China science writers
People from Guyuan
Scientists from Ningxia
Year of birth missing (living people)